German submarine U-1172 was a Type VIIC/41 U-boat built for Nazi Germany's Kriegsmarine for service during World War II.
She was laid down on 7 June 1943 by Danziger Werft, Danzig as yard number 144, launched on 3 December 1943 and commissioned on 20 April 1944 under Oberleutnant zur See Jürgen Kuhlmann.

Design
Like all Type VIIC/41 U-boats, U-1172 had a displacement of  when at the surface and  while submerged.

U-1172 was fitted with five  torpedo tubes (four fitted at the bow and one at the stern), fourteen torpedoes, one  SK C/35 naval gun, (220 rounds), one  Flak M42 and two  C/30 anti-aircraft guns. Its complement was between forty-four and sixty.

Sensors

Passive sonar
U-1172 was one of only ten Type VIIC's to be fitted with a Balkongerät (literally 'Balcony apparatus or equipment'). The Balkongerät was used on U-boats (and ). The Balkongerät was standard on the Type XXI and the Type XXIII. Nonetheless, it was also fitted to several Type IXs and one Type X. The Balkongerät was an improved version of Gruppenhorchgerät (GHG) (group listening device). The GHG had 24 hydrophones, the Balkongerät had 48 hydrophones and improved electronics, which enabled more accurate readings to be taken.

Service history
The boat's service career began on 20 April 1944 with the 8th Training Flotilla, followed by active service with 11th Flotilla on 1 December 1944. U-1172 took part in no wolfpacks.

Summary of raiding history

See also
 Battle of the Atlantic

References

Notes

Citations

Bibliography

German Type VIIC/41 submarines
U-boats commissioned in 1944
World War II submarines of Germany
1943 ships
World War II shipwrecks in the Irish Sea
Ships built in Danzig
Ships lost with all hands
U-boats sunk by British warships
U-boats sunk by depth charges
Maritime incidents in January 1945